DeSoto Lake is a reservoir in Floyd County, in the U.S. state of Georgia.

The lake was named for Hernando de Soto, a Spanish explorer.

See also
List of lakes in Georgia (U.S. state)

References

Reservoirs in Georgia (U.S. state)
Bodies of water of Floyd County, Georgia